Kappa Crateris (κ Crateris) is the Bayer designation for a star in the southern constellation of Crater. It has an apparent visual magnitude of 5.94, which, according to the Bortle scale, can be seen with the naked eye under dark suburban skies. The distance to this star, as determined from an annual parallax shift of 14.27 mas, is around 229 light years.

This is an evolved F-type giant star with a stellar classification of F5/6 III, where the F5/6 indicates the spectrum lies intermediate between types F5 and F6. It is an estimated 1.74 billion years old and is spinning with a projected rotational velocity of 39 km/s. Kappa Crateris has 1.74 times the mass of the Sun, and radiates 17 times the solar luminosity from its outer atmosphere at an effective temperature of 6,545 K.

Kappa Crateris has a visual companion: a magnitude 13.0 star located at an angular separation of 24.6 arc seconds along a position angle of 343°, as of 2000.

References

F-type giants
Crater (constellation)
Crateris, Kappa
Durchmusterung objects
Crateris, 16
099564
055874
4416